The Minor Basilica of Saint Nicholas of Tolentino and Shrine of El Santo Cristo Milagroso ( | Spanish: Basílica Menor de San Nicolás de Tolentino, Santuario de Santo Cristo) is a Roman Catholic church in the municipality of Sinait, Ilocos Sur, in northern Philippines. The church is known for housing the El Santo Cristo Milagroso, a life-sized dark-skinned image of crucified Christ. It is dedicated to Saint Nicholas of Tolentino and is under the administration of the Archdiocese of Nueva Segovia. In May 2021, it was announced that it was granted the title of minor basilica, the 19th in the Philippines and the first in its archdiocese.

History 
 It was founded in 1574 and was completed in 1598, making it as one of the oldest religious buildings in the Philippines and the region. The Augustinian friars initially administered the church until it was transferred to the secular clergy in 1772 before being returned in 1854 to the Augustinians.

The church was supposed to be formally elevated into a minor basilica on September 10, 2021, feast day of Saint Nicholas of Tolentino. However due to the on-going COVID-19 pandemic, the official solemn declaration of its elevation to a minor basilica was done on February 16, 2022 in a Eucharistic Celebration presided by the Apostolic Nuncio to the Philippines Archbishop Charles John Brown with Archbishop of Nueva Segovia Marlo Mendoza Peralta (concelebrants) and Archbishop of Lingayen-Dagupan Socrates Villegas (concelebrants), and attended by Archbishop of Manila Jose Fuerte Cardinal Advincula (homilist), Archbishop-emeritus of Cotabato Orlando Beltran Cardinal Quevedo (who gave a message), and six other bishops from Northern Luzon. Upon its elevation, it shall be known as Basilica Menor de San Nicolas de Tolentino, Santuario de Santo Cristo.

Santo Cristo Milagroso 
The 400-year old image of El Santo Cristo Milagroso shares its history with the La Virgen Milagrosa, a Marian image enshrined in the Saint John the Baptist Basilica in the neighboring Badoc.

Local accounts tell that in 1620, both the images of Santo Cristo Milagroso and Virgen Milagrosa were found in a floating crate at the boundary of the present-day barangays of Dadalaquiten Norte in Sinait, and Paguetpet in Badoc. The image of the crucified Christ went on to be enshrined in Sinait, while the Marian image was brought to Badoc. Devotees fondly call the image as Apo Lakay, and is attributed with providing miraculous healing.
The devotion to the Santo Cristo Milagroso draws multitude of pilgrims to the church of Sinait especially every Friday, earning the municipality the moniker "Quiapo of the North". A smaller image of Santo Cristo Milagroso is also installed in a small chapel in the shore of Dadalaquiten Norte where it was found.

References

External links
 Facebook page 

Roman Catholic churches in Ilocos Sur
Baroque church buildings in the Philippines
16th-century Roman Catholic church buildings in the Philippines
Baroque architecture in the Philippines
Basilica churches in the Philippines
Spanish Colonial architecture in the Philippines
Churches in the Roman Catholic Archdiocese of Nueva Segovia